The 1938 edition of the Campeonato Carioca kicked off on August 27, 1938 and ended on January 8, 1939. It was organized by LFRJ (Liga de Futebol do Rio de Janeiro, or Rio de Janeiro Football League). Nine teams participated. Fluminense won the title for the 12th time. no teams were relegated.

System
The tournament would be disputed in a double round-robin format, with the team with the most points winning the title.

Torneio Municipal

Championship

References

Campeonato Carioca seasons
Carioca